Pterostylis gibbosa, commonly known as the Illawarra rustyhood, or Illawarra greenhood, is a plant in the orchid family Orchidaceae and is endemic to New South Wales. It has a rosette of leaves at its base and up to nine bright green flowers with translucent "windows", relatively wide lateral sepals with short-pointed tips and a dark, fleshy, insect-like labellum.

Description
Pterostylis gibbosa, is a terrestrial,  perennial, deciduous, herb with an underground tuber. Flowering plants have a rosette at the base of the flowering spike but the leaves are usually withered by flowering time. The flowers lean forward and there are three to six stem leaves wrapped around the flowering spike. The "head" end is thick and has many short hairs and the "body" has four to eight longer hairs on each side. Flowering occurs from August to November.

Taxonomy and naming
Pterostylis gibbosa was first formally described in 1810 by Robert Brown and the description was published in Prodromus Florae Novae Hollandiae et Insulae Van Diemen. The specific epithet (gibbosa) is a Latin word meaning "very humped" or "crooked".

Distribution and habitat
The Illawarra rustyhood grows in forest with grasses in scattered populations in the Hunter, Illawarra and Shoalhaven regions. It is no longer found on the Cumberland Plain where it was first collected.

Conservation
Pterostylis gibbosa is listed as "endangered" under the Australian Government Environment Protection and Biodiversity Conservation Act 1999. The main threats to the species are urbanisation, grazing by domestic stock, weed invasion and inappropriate fire regimes.

References

gibbosa
Endemic orchids of Australia
Orchids of New South Wales
Plants described in 1810
Taxa named by Robert Brown (botanist, born 1773)